Conny Stuart (5 September 1913 – 22 August 2010), pseudonym of Cornelia van Meijgaard, was a Dutch actress, singer, and cabaretière.

Biography
Stuart was born in Wijhe and grew up in The Hague, near the Peace Palace. Her father was the administrator of the baron. 

During her education at the HBS Bleyenburg she took on the name "Stuart" and took piano lessons. In this period, she got the nickname "Puck". Stuart started her career as chansonnière and performed with the band of Freddy Johnson. On 25 July 1939 she made her radio debut.

In World War II, Stuart met Wim Sonneveld, and began to perform in his ensemble. Sonneveld stimulated her comic qualities, for instance by letting his stage writer Hella Haasse write a farcical song like "Yvonne de spionne" for her. In the 1950s she became the leading lady of the show. Annie M.G. Schmidt, who wrote for the shows in those days, made sure she at least had one solo per show. She also could be heard in popular comical radio shows like Mimosa and Koek en ei.

In those years she was married to Henri Hofman and had two sons. But in 1957 she divorced and married fellow actor Joop Doderer. The two later divorced in 1960.

From the 1960s on, she became one of The Netherlands' greatest musical stars. She mainly acted in the musicals of Annie M.G. Schmidt and Harry Bannink, including their first, Heerlijk duurt het langst from 1965. The show was an incredible success, and Schmidt and Bannink wrote four more musicals for her. She ended her career in 1985 with her stage show De Stuart Story, accompanied by Louis van Dijk, where she performed old success songs and new songs written for her by Schmidt.

External links
 
 Biography

1913 births
2010 deaths
Dutch women singers
Dutch stage actresses
Dutch musical theatre actresses
Dutch cabaret performers
Entertainers from The Hague
People from Wijhe